The Planning and Environment Act 1987 is an Act passed by the Parliament of Victoria in 1987 to provide a framework for urban planning and the use and development of land in the State of Victoria.

Purpose
The Act's stated purpose is "to establish a framework for planning the use, development and protection of land in Victoria in the present and long-term interests of all Victorians."

Background
Suggestions for legislation surrounding urban planning in Victoria materialised in the 1920s. However, it was not until years later that the initial Town and Country Planning Act 1944 was enacted that provided a regulatory framework for land use and development in the state. Later, in 1961, the Act was amended by the Bolte Government to broaden the scope of planning controls and workability of its systems. The Town and Country Act was then amended for a final time in 1984 on similar administrative principles.

When the Act went through the second reading in the Legislative Council, then Minister for Planning and Environment Jim Kennan addressed the rationale behind the introduction of new legislation regarding planning and replacing the considered obsolete Town and Country Act.

Concerns raised from the opposition during debates of the bill's merits regarding the jurisdiction of the Act and the abilities for relevant decision-making bodies on the usage of land in their respective areas. Kennen responded by saying the Act would have a broad scope to consolidate practices.

The bill would subsequently pass both houses of the Parliament of Victoria with amendments and assented on 27 May 1987 by the Governor of Victoria The Reverend Davis McCaughey AC.

Scope of the Act
The Act sets out the legal framework for planning instruments and regulating land use and development in Victoria. The main instruments that allow for urban planning to be enabled in Victoria are:

 The Act itself and relevant statutes 
 Ministerial Directions
 Planning Provisions and Planning Schemes
 Authorities and Enforcement
 Appeals and Dispute Resolution

The instruments of the Act allow tangible planning policies, such as the Planning Provisions and Planning Schemes to be created, amended and ultimately administered. Under Section S8, the Act also outlines the jurisdiction of the Minister for Planning and their ability to direct these provisions and schemes and the role of relevant authorities such as local government area councils (LGAs) or municipalities. These positions are respectively known as "Planning Authorities" and "Responsible Authorities" with each role varying between setting out relevant policies and directions as well as enforcing the legislation through processes such as to permit applications and panels.

In 1996, the Act saw the addition of the Planning and Environment (Planning Schemes) Act 1996, which set out a standardised and universal template for Planning Schemes called the Victorian Planning Provisions. The Provisions stipulates required documentation and inclusions regarding planning controls from LGAs. Generally, they must include the purpose and vision of the scheme, planning policy frameworks, zone and overlay controls, and other relevant provisions.

Planning Schemes are a legally binding document that sets out planning controls for the use and development of land in the respective jurisdictions of LGAs. However, in some cases, the Minister is also responsible for certain applications and responsible for the application process and decision. For example, the City of Melbourne has its own planning schemes relevant to its own geographical area.

Both the Planning Provisions and Planning Schemes can be amended by both LGAs and the Minister for Planning. However, such desire to amend these documents have differing processes; The LGA must go through a formal process that the Minister must approve while the Minister can bypass these steps at their discretion under their responsibilities within S8.

The nesting of a planning process between two levels of governments within the state creates a framework similar to a judicial system such as the Supreme Court of Victoria. By way of the Act, enforcement is generally administered through planning permits and relevant processes for grounds of approval or refusal. Under Sections 47 to 71, this process is to ensure that the intended land use and development are aligned with the Act and both the Planning Provisions and Planning Scheme. Furthermore, responsible authorities can also direct applications with a 'Section 173 Agreement' that negotiates a consideration with an owner or developer of land to stipulate conditions or restrictions for land use and development or other objectives concerning it.

Indeed, there are mechanisms in place for enforcement, non-compliance and dispute resolution. Sections 114 allows a responsible authority or any person to apply to the Victorian Civil and Administrative Tribunal hand an enforcement order that can stop, not start, maintain or restore relevant actions to use and development. Additionally, Section 125 allows an escalation of disputes to the court system through requests for injunctions for perceived non-compliance or enforcement orders. Finally, Section 130 allows responsible authorities to serve infringement notices to any perceived non-compliance or contraventions in areas in which the authority is responsible. The enforcement of the act is also complemented by protections set out within its body but also complemented by other legislation such as the Heritage Act 2017 and Environmental Protection Act 2017 which can be administered through referrals in application or planning scheme overlays on a site. Yet, there have been criticisms of this enforcement mechanism, as seen with the non-compliance case of the demolition of the Carlton Inn by developers in 2016 and the protracted legal proceedings between the developers, the State Government and the public community.

Changes to the Act
The Planning and Environment Act 1987 has undergone various changes and other legislation to the initial Act. Some examples include the establishment of the Victorian Planning Authority (VPA), a statutory body that focuses on long-term strategic planning and the COVID-19 Omnibus (Emergency Measures) Act 2020 that allowed digital inspections and hearings of planning related matters.

References

External links
Text of the Act

Urban planning in Australia
1987 in Australian law
Victoria (Australia) legislation
1980s in Victoria (Australia)